Dugo Polje, which translates as Long Field from Serbo-Croatian, may refer to:

 Dugo Polje (Sokobanja), village in Sokobanja municipality, Serbia
 Dugo Polje (Modriča), village in Modriča municipality, Bosnia and Herzegovina
 Dugo Polje (Kiseljak), village in Kiseljak municipality, Bosnia and Herzegovina